Malli is an Indian Tamil-language soap opera that aired on Puthuyugam TV from 23 November 2013 to 1 September 2014 on Monday through Friday at 6:30PM IST for 260 episodes. The show stars Sandra, Sonia Agarwal, Sethu Darwin, Baby Harini, Murali, Susithira and directed by A. R. Ramesh. This serial also re-telecast on same Channel It airs Monday through Friday at 08:30pm (2015).

Plot
The story revolves around two characters, Shivani and Bala. Shivani born in a rich family who gets neglected from the parental love since their parents run after money and profession. But she manages to get brotherly love from Bala who hails from a middle-class family. Bala imagines Shivani as his older sister Malli who's dead. Getting the affection needed, Shivani too think herself as Malli at times.

Cast
 Sonia Agarwal / Sandra
 Deepthi Sri
 Sethu Darwin
 Baby Harini
 Theni Murugan
 Murali
 Susithira
 Lingges Nadarajan

International broadcast
  In Singapore Tamil Channel on V Thamizh HD. It aired Monday through Friday at 8:30PM.
  In Malaysia Tamil Channel on Astro Vaanavil. It airs Monday through Friday at 11:00Am & 4:30PM.
 It airs in United States, Europe and Australia on Athavan TV on Monday through Friday at 7:30PM.

References

External links
 Puthuyugam TV on YouTube
Malli on Youtube

Puthuyugam TV television series
Tamil-language children's television series
Tamil-language fantasy television series
2010s Tamil-language television series
2013 Tamil-language television series debuts
Tamil-language television shows
2014 Tamil-language television series endings